Eshratabad (also Romanized as ‘Eshratābād and ‘Ashratābād; also known as ‘Eshratābād-e Jadīd and ‘Eyshratābād-e Jadīd) is a village in Belharat Rural District, Miyan Jolgeh District, Nishapur County, Razavi Khorasan Province, Iran. At the 2006 census, its population was 279, in 77 families.

References 

Populated places in Nishapur County